Morning Over Midnight is an album from the Arizona rock band Fivespeed, released in January 2006.

Track listing

External links
Morning Over Midnight by Fivespeed @ ARTISTdirect.com

References

2006 albums